Caseros might refer to:
 Caseros, Buenos Aires, Argentina
 Caseros (Entre Ríos), Argentina
 Caseros Department, a provincial political subdivision in Santa Fe Province, Argentina
 Caseros Prison, Argentina
 Battle of Caseros, Argentina
 Caseros (Buenos Aires Metro)

See also 
Casero